Los Santos is a town and municipality in the Santander Department in northeastern Colombia.

References

Municipalities of Santander Department